Turbinicarpus lophophoroides is a species of plant in the family Cactaceae. It is endemic to Mexico.  Its natural habitats are subtropical or tropical dry lowland grassland and hot deserts. It is threatened by illegal collecting, habitat loss and insect parasitism.

References

Sources

External links
 
 
 

lophophoroides
Cacti of Mexico
Endemic flora of Mexico
Near threatened plants
Endangered biota of Mexico
Taxonomy articles created by Polbot